Big Angry Fish is a New Zealand fishing television show hosted by Milan Radonich and Nathan O'Hearn. The programme began airing onwards from the end of April 2012, with thirteen episodes screening weekly on Sundays on Three and weekdays on One (Australian TV channel). A second season began at the end of July 2013, and a third season began at the end of July 2014, the fourth season due to start on 26 July 2015.

Concept 
The show is about teaching the anglers the knowledge and techniques required to target trophy fish in shallow water. There is a strong focus on being respectful to sea life and its habitats.

Locations 
The majority of season one took viewers to fishing locations around New Zealand, but two episodes are filmed at North America and Thailand. Season 2 included destinations to Panama and Australia, and season 3 was solely focused on New Zealand fishing destinations

Reception and other information 
Big Angry Fish (and Fishing Edge) were praised for "consistent fishing action, laidback yet knowledgeable hosts and minimal product plugging".

In 2015, a kayak fisherman who regularly watched the show won a trip on the water with the programme's presenters.

References

External links 
 

2012 New Zealand television series debuts
2019 New Zealand television series endings
2010s New Zealand television series
English-language television shows
Fishing television series
New Zealand sports television series
Three (TV channel) original programming